The 2012 Nehru Cup was the 15th edition of the Nehru Cup and 3rd Nehru Cup since it was revived in 2007. It was held from 22 August to 2 September. The tournament was hosted in New Delhi, India. A total of 5 teams participated in the tournament through being invited by the All India Football Federation. The final match happened between India and Cameroon and India won the match in penalty shoot out.

India won the Nehru Cup after defeating the Cameroon 5–4 on penalties after the match ended 2–2 in extra-time.

Format
On 15 June 2012 the All India Football Federation announced the format for the 2012 Nehru Cup. The tournament was played in a round-robin style. In the end the top 2 teams India & Cameroon from the 5 teams played in the final, which took place on 2 September.

Broadcasting
NEO Sports, a premium all Sports Channel from the bouquet of NEO Sports Broadcast Pvt. Ltd., has acquired the exclusive broadcast rights of 2012 Nehru Cup in the Indian Sub Continent (India, Pakistan, Sri Lanka, Bangladesh, Nepal, Bhutan and Maldives).

Squads

Venue

Teams
Teams were:

Matches
The First Round teams and matches were announced on 6 August 2012 by the All India Football Federation.

Final

Winners

Statistics

Goalscorers

References

External links
 Details at Goal.com
 Details at Soccerway.com
 Details at Futbol24.com

 
2012
2011–12 in Indian football
2012 in Asian football